Greenup County is a county located along the Ohio River in the northeastern part of the U.S. state of Kentucky. As of the 2020 census, the population was 35,962. The county was founded in 1803 and named in honor of Christopher Greenup. Its county seat is Greenup.
Greenup County is part of the Huntington-Ashland, WV-KY-OH Metropolitan Statistical Area.

History
Located with its northern border formed by the Ohio River, Greenup County was organized by an act of the General Assembly of Kentucky on December 12, 1803, from Mason County, which included the majority of eastern Kentucky at the time.

Three courthouses have served Greenup County. The first courthouse, built of logs, was replaced by a brick structure in 1811.

Law and government
The current officials of Greenup County are:
 County Judge/Executive: Bobby Hall
 County Commissioner: Ernest Duty
 County Commissioner: Derrick Bradley
 County Commissioner: Lee Wireman
 County Attorney: Matthew Warnock
 County Coroner: L. Neil Wright
 County Jailer: Larry Pancake
 County Treasurer: Sharon Bates
 County Sheriff: Matt Smith
 County Surveyor: Jason Leadingham
 Property Valuation Administrator: Tony Quillen
 County Clerk: Andrew Imel 
 Circuit Court Clerk: Allen Reed

Greenup County is a part of the 20th Judicial Circuit (general jurisdiction) and the 20th Judicial District (limited jurisdiction) of the Kentucky Court of Justice (the state's unified court system), which includes neighboring Lewis County. The officials in the 20th Judicial Circuit are:
 Circuit Court, Division 1 (General/Felony Division): Brian C. McCloud 
 Circuit Court, Division 2 (Family Court Division): Jeffrey L. Preston
 Commonwealth's Attorney (felony prosecutor): Melvin C. Leonhart

The judge in the 20th Judicial District is:
 District Court: Paul E. Craft
Misdemeanor criminal cases brought in District Court are prosecuted by the County Attorney's office.

Geography

Features
Like most eastern Kentucky counties, Greenup County is predominantly made up of rolling hills and valleys. The land in the Ohio River valley is generally flat and mostly populated by industry, commerce and residential development. Beyond this the land gives way to a series of hills and valleys that are representative of the foothills of the Appalachian Mountains. It is relatively sparsely inhabited by farmers.  Among these hills, popular fishing spots can be found among the Little Sandy River, Greenbo Lake, and Tygarts Creek. Greenup County's land is still predominantly covered by forest with minimal clear cutting of the old forests.

The soil has long supported a healthy agriculture and livestock industry.  Traditionally, this has meant a sizeable tobacco base and cattle ranching. Since the late 20th century, as traditional agriculture products have been dominated by industrial-scale agri-corporations, growth has been seen in non-traditional products such as American Quarter Horses, ostriches, and marijuana.

Major highways

U.S. Highway 23 is the primary route for travel through Greenup County.  It enters Greenup County at the southeasternmost point and follows the Ohio River north along the eastern border passing through Russell, Flatwoods, Raceland, Wurtland, Greenup and South Shore. It then exits just west of South Shore crossing the Ohio River via the U.S. Grant Bridge into Portsmouth, Ohio and continuing north towards Columbus, Ohio.

The AA Highway begins at U.S. Highway 23 and connects to U.S. Highway 52 in Ohio via the Jesse Stuart Memorial Bridge.  The AA Highway (also known as Route 10) runs west intersecting Route 7 and eventually exiting west into Lewis County.  Since its completion in 1995, the AA Highway has allowed Northeastern Kentucky residents to more easily travel to Maysville, Kentucky as well as Northern Kentucky and Cincinnati, Ohio.

The northern terminus of the Industrial Parkway (Kentucky Route 67) ends at U.S. Highway 23 at Wurtland. This highway serves to connect Wurtland and the surrounding towns of Greenup, Flatwoods and the unincorporated area of Argillite to the EastPark industrial park and Interstate 64 in Carter County.

Adjacent counties
 Boyd County  (southeast)
 Carter County  (southwest)
 Lewis County  (west)
 Scioto County, Ohio  (north)
 Lawrence County, Ohio  (east)

Demographics

As of the census of 2000, there were 36,891 people, 14,536 households, and 11,032 families residing in the county. The racial makeup of the county was 98.07% White, 0.57% Black or African American, 0.19% Native American, 0.38% Asian, 0.15% from other races, and 0.64% from two or more races.  0.55% of the population were Hispanic or Latino of any race.

There were 14,536 households, out of which 32.00% had children under the age of 18 living with them, 62.30% were married couples living together, 10.40% had a female householder with no husband present, and 24.10% were non-families. 21.70% of all households were made up of individuals, and 10.00% had someone living alone who was 65 years of age or older.  The average household size was 2.51 and the average family size was 2.91.

In the county, the population was spread out, with 23.60% under the age of 18, 7.90% from 18 to 24, 27.90% from 25 to 44, 26.00% from 45 to 64, and 14.60% who were 65 years of age or older.  The median age was 39 years. For every 100 females there were 92.80 males.  For every 100 females age 18 and over, there were 89.30 males.

The median income for a household in the county was $32,142, and the median income for a family was $38,928. Males had a median income of $35,475 versus $21,198 for females. The per capita income for the county was $17,137.  About 11.60% of families and 14.10% of the population were below the poverty line, including 18.60% of those under age 18 and 9.90% of those age 65 or over.

Politics

Education

Public school districts
 Greenup County School District serves the cities of Greenup, Wurtland, South Shore and rural Greenup County.
 Russell Independent School District serves the cities of Russell, Flatwoods and Bellefonte.
 Raceland-Worthington Independent School District serves the cities of Raceland and Worthington.

Places of interest
 EastPark
 Greenbo Lake State Resort Park
 Raceland Race Course

Alcohol sales
Greenup County is a moist county, meaning that sale of alcohol in the county is prohibited except in certain areas as voted on by the residents of the area, including at least one area where full retail sales are permitted. In the case of Greenup County, alcohol sales are permitted in the following areas:
 The city of Russell has allowed the full retail sale of alcohol since 2014 after allowing, since 2008, by the drink alcohol sales at restaurants which seat at least 100 diners and derive at least 70% of their total sales from food.
The cities of Greenup, Raceland and South Shore allow full retail sale of alcohol after voters approved local option petitions in 2020.
 The city of Bellefonte has allowed the full retail sale of alcohol since 2017 after allowing, since 2009, the Bellefonte Country Club to sell alcohol by the drink under a provision that allows voters of an otherwise dry precinct to allow alcohol sales at a specific, voter approved, USGA regulation golf course. The status change had no practical effect within the city itself as restaurants (other than the Bellefonte Country Club), liquor stores, gas stations, grocery stores and other businesses that generally sell alcohol are, by local ordinance, prohibited within the city limits of Bellefonte. The change in status allowed the Bellefonte Country Club to receive a "caterer's license" to serve alcohol by the drink at private offsite events, which was not permitted under the previous alcohol status.
The Hunnewell election precinct in unincorporated Greenup County approved a petition in 2020 allowing the River Bend Golf Course to sell alcohol by the drink under a provision that allows voters of an otherwise dry precinct to allow alcohol sales at a specific, voter approved, USGA regulation golf course.

The sale of alcohol is prohibited in the cities of Flatwoods, Worthington, Wurtland and in all areas of unincorporated Greenup County outside the River Bend Golf Course.

Communities

 Bellefonte
 Flatwoods
 Greenup (county seat)
 Lloyd
 Raceland
 Russell
 South Portsmouth
 South Shore
 Worthington
 Wurtland

Notable people
 Billy Ray Cyrus – singer/actor, son of Ron Cyrus and father of Miley Cyrus
 Ron Cyrus – politician
 Don Gullett – Major League Baseball pitcher
 Herb Roe – mural artist
 John Stephenson – Major League Baseball Catcher
 Jesse Stuart – Kentucky Poet Laureate
 Clint "Hawk" Thomas – baseball player for the New York Black Yankees of the Negro leagues
 Richard Whitt - Newspaper journalist, (The Courier-Journal), 1978 Pulitzer Prize for his reporting on the fire at the Beverly Hills Supper Club fire in Southgate, Kentucky.

See also

 National Register of Historic Places listings in Greenup County, Kentucky

References

External links
 Government website
 The Kentucky Highlands Project
 Detailed Road Map of Greenup County
 Greenup County Tourism and Convention Commission

 
Kentucky counties on the Ohio River
1803 establishments in Kentucky
Populated places established in 1803